The 1967 Vancouver Royal Canadians season was the first season in the history of the Vancouver Royal Canadians soccer club. The club played in the United Soccer Association (USA), a league that used clubs from Europe and South America to represent American and Canadian cities. First division Football League side Sunderland A.F.C, who finished 17th in the 1966–67 Football League, was the club that represented Vancouver in the USA. The club played its home games at Empire Stadium in Vancouver, British Columbia.

Following the 1967 season, the USA and the National Professional Soccer League merged to form the North American Soccer League. The San Francisco Golden Gate Gales of the US merged with Vancouver, and the club was renamed the Vancouver Royals for the inaugural season of the NASL.

Players
The Vancouver Royals' roster was made up of Sunderland A.F.C. players on their summer break.

 Num = Number, Pos = Position, Height in cm, Weight in kg, Apps = Appearances, G = Goals, A = Assists

Results

Standings

Match results

References

General

Specific

Vancouver Royal Canadians season
Sunderland A.F.C.
Vancouver Royal Canadians season
Vancouver Royal Canadians
Vancouver Royal Canadians
Vancouver Royal Canadians
Vancouver Royals seasons